Liu Baojun  (Hanyu Pinyin), or Liu Pao-ch'ün (Wade-Giles) (1892–1947) was a teacher of the martial arts of Meihuaquan and Taijiquan.  He was also known as Liu Jinchen (Hanyu Pinyin), or Liu Chin-ch'en (Wade-Giles).

Biography
Liu Baojun was born in 1892 in the village of Caozhou.  He was a master of Meihuaquan, a style that he may have learned from Kong Qingbiao.  After working as a bodyguard, from 1925 onwards he taught in Peixian.  He was executed in 1947, accused of collaborating with the Japanese occupation army.  From the transcript of a short interview with Chang Yu-shin, son of Chang Dsu Yao (a famous student of Liu Baojun, who later moved to Italy):

In October 1925 Liu Baojun participated in a competition in Nanjing, where he won a pair of double sabres (shuangdao) as a prize. In 1937, in Peixian, he participated in a competition in which he won a banner with a golden dart as a prize.  Master Liu was a direct-lineage student of Yang style tai chi chuan Grandmaster Yang Chengfu, as evidenced in Yang Chengfu's first book, the Taijiquan Shiyongfa, that contains the list of his disciples, where Liu Baojun's name appears.

Liu Baojun and Meihuaquan
Liu Baojun belonged to the Bai branch of the Meihuaquan martial art family (Baijiazhi Meihuaquan).  When he moved to Peixian, he created his own branch of the style, which was later called, in his honor, Liupai Meihuaquan (Boxing of the Plum Flower, of the School of Liu.) Initially he taught with Li Zhengting, who was from the Luodi Meihuaquan family, but they later parted ways.

His most famous students in Peixian were Chang Dsu Yao, Fang Dunyi, Fang Dunle, Zhao Houfu, and others.

Bibliography

References

1892 births
1947 deaths
People executed by the Republic of China
Tai chi practitioners from Shandong
People from Heze
Executed Republic of China people
Executed people from Shandong